Delio Rodríguez Barros (19 April 1916 – 14 January 1994) was a Spanish professional road racing cyclist and sprinter. Despite winning 12 stages at the 1941 Vuelta and 8 stages at the 1942 Vuelta, Rodríguez failed to make the top five places in the overall standings. Due to World War II, the event was not held in 1943 and 1944, but Rodríguez wanted to win the 1945 event, which he did by going on an early breakaway and winning stage 2 by over a half-hour. In the end, Delio won the event by over 30 minutes, captured six stages and the points classification, too.  At the 1947 Vuelta, he finished on the podium in third, and finished with eight stage wins.
  
Rodríguez is the all-time record holder for stage wins at the Vuelta a España with 39 stage wins conducted over 5 events. Rodríguez had two younger brothers, Emilio and Manolo that were also professional cyclists. Emilio won the overall race while Manolo came second in the 1950 Vuelta a España.

Major achievements 

1935
1st GP San Froilan Lugo
1939
2nd Clásica a los Puertos
6th Overall Volta a Catalunya
1940
1st Overall GP Agustin
1st Stages 1, 2, 3 & 4
1st Overall Vuelta a Alava
1st Stages 1, 2 & 3
1st Overall Madrid-Salamanca-Madrid
1st Stages 1 & 2 
Volta a Catalunya
1st Stages 1 & 2
1st Stage 1b Trofeo Masferrer
2nd Overall Circuito del Norte
1st Stages 1 & 2
3rd Overall Vuelta a Cantabria
1st Stage 1
3rd Clásica a los Puertos
1941
1st Overall Vuelta a Alava
1st Stages 1 & 2
Volta a Catalunya
1st Stages 4, 5, 6 & 9
Circuito del Norte
1st Stages 1, 3, 6 & 7
Vuelta a Navarra
1st Stages 2 & 4
1st Subida al Naranco
4th Overall Vuelta a España
1st Stages 3, 5, 6, 10, 11, 12, 15, 16a (ITT), 16b, 17, 18 & 19
1942
Volta a Catalunya
1st Stages 7 & 9
3rd Overall Circuito Castilla-Leon-Asturias
1st Stages 1, 3, 5, 6 & 8
7th Overall Vuelta a España
1st Stages 2, 4, 5, 6, 7, 9 (ITT), 12 & 14
1943
Volta a Catalunya
1st Stages 3, 6 & 9
1st Stage 3 GP Ayutamiento de Bilbao
1st Subida al Naranco
3rd Circuito Castilla-Leon-Asturias
1st Stage 2 & 4
1944
Volta a Catalunya
1st Stages 1, 2 & 3
Vuelta a Cantabria
1st Stages 1 & 2
3rd Overall Volta a la Comunitat Valenciana
1st Stages 1, 2, 3, 4 & 6
1945
1st  Overall Vuelta a España
1st  Points classification
1st Stages 2, 8, 9, 14, 16 & 18
1st  Overall Tour of Galicia
1st Stages 2b, 5b & 7
1946
Vuelta a Castilla y León
1st Stages 4, 5, 6 & 7
5th Overall Vuelta a España
1st Stages 13, 14, 15 & 17
1947
Vuelta a Asturias
1st Stages 2 & 10
1st Stage 1 Vuelta a Castilla y León
1st Stage 3 Vuelta a Burgos
2nd Clásica a los Puertos
3rd Overall Vuelta a España
1st  Points classification
1st Stages 1, 5, 8, 10, 14, 15, 18 & 23
3rd Overall Tour of Galicia
1st Stages 5 & 6
1948
Volta a Portugal
1st Stages 2, 3 & 11
7th Overall Volta a la Comunitat Valenciana
1st Stages 1, 3 & 6

References

1916 births
1994 deaths
People from Ponteareas
Sportspeople from the Province of Pontevedra
Cyclists from Galicia (Spain)
Vuelta a España winners
Spanish male cyclists